Poles in France form one of the largest Polish diaspora communities in Europe. Between 500,000 and one million people of Polish descent live in France, concentrated in the Nord-Pas de Calais region, in the metropolitan area of Lille, the coal-mining basin (Bassin Minier) around Lens and Valenciennes and in the Ile-de-France.

Prominent members of the Polish community in France have included king Stanisław Leszczyński, Frédéric Chopin, Adam Mickiewicz, Adam Jerzy Czartoryski, Aleksander Chodźko,  Marie Curie, Michel Poniatowski, Raymond Kopa, Ludovic Obraniak, Edward Gierek (who was raised there), Matt Pokora and singer Jean-Jacques Goldman and Rene Goscinny.

History

Polish-Lithuanian Commonwealth
Close ties between the Kingdom of France and Polish–Lithuanian Commonwealth were cemented in the 16th century, when emissaries from Poland persuaded French Prince Henri de Valois to stand for election as King of the Commonwealth. Valois won and reigned for two years in Poland but abdicated after he inherited the French throne as Henri III. The queen consort of Louis XV and grandmother of several of his successors was Marie Leszczyńska (1703-1768).

French Revolution and Napoleonic wars
Many members of the Polish Szlachta fled to France during the rule of Napoleon when 100,000 Poles tried to throw off Russian rule in Poland early in the 19th century. Many had enlisted to fight in the Grande Armée, like Józef Antoni Poniatowski, Ludwik Mateusz Dembowski 
Polish commanders of the Napoleonic Wars and Polish legionnaires.

Great Emigration (1831-1870)

The so-called Great Emigration was the flood of exiles in the aftermath of both the 1830-1 November Uprising, and a generation later, the January Uprising, made up of political élites mainly from the Russian Partition of Poland-Lithuania between 1831–1870 who settled in France.

Interwar period
Another wave of Polish migration, this time in search of manual work, took place between the two World Wars, when they were hired as contract workers to work temporarily in France. After the outbreak of World War II Polish refugees also fled Nazi or Soviet occupation.

Polish resistance during the Nazi occupation in France

During the Nazi occupation of Poland, a specific Polish Resistance group, Polska Organizacja Walki o Niepodleglosc – Organisation Polonaise de Lutte pour l’Indépendance (POWN), was created on September 6, 1941 by the Polish general consul in Paris, A. Kawalkowski (code name Justyn), and fought alongside the French Resistance. There were also other Polish Resistance movements in France, most notably former soldiers from the Jaroslaw Dabrowski Brigade who had fought in the International Brigades during the Spanish Civil War went on in their struggle against Fascism in the FTP-MOI. Since 1941 PPS activists in Northern France had also founded two resistance movements, Organisation S and Orzel Bialy (White Eagle). In 1944 Polish Committees for National Liberation (PKWN) were set up to support the Communist Polish army. There were clashes between POWN resistants, under the authority of the London-based Polish government in exile, and the Communist FTP-MOI resistants.

French Poles after WWII
When the Communists took power in Poland, several thousand French Poles decided to go and live in the "Socialist paradise", as some Armenians in France moved to the Armenian Soviet Socialist Republic.

There are estimates of 100,000 to 200,000 Poles living in Paris, and many EU program guest workers live in regions of the south, including Arles, Marseille and Perpignan.

From the year 2012 
The number of new Poles who migrated to France has multiplied, many are students and traders and other percentage are displaced workers who come from Poland to work in France. Poles are well integrated into French society. The number of new Polish citizens in France amounts to 350,000 in 2012.

Notable people

See also 
 See :Category:French people of Polish descent for prominent Poles in France
 France–Poland relations
 Great Emigration
 Polish Catholic Mission
 Rosa Bailly
 Polonia
 Migrations from Poland since EU accession
 Blue Army (Poland) (1917–1919)
 Polish Army in France (1939-1940)
 Cimetière des Champeaux de Montmorency

References

External links 
List of Polish associations in France
Radio Polonaise in Paris
Poles in France
Poles in France
Poles in all France

European diaspora in France
 
France–Poland relations
France
Immigration to France by country of origin